Karel Francis Fialka is an Indian-born British singer, songwriter, musician and record producer, best known for his 1987 single, "Hey Matthew".

Career
He was born Karel Francis Fialka in Bengal, India, to a Scottish mother and Czech father. Fialka was launched in 1980 as "the street poet of the 1980s." Fialka's debut album Still Life was well received. The single "The Eyes Have It" received radio play.

Fialka had a top 10 hit in 1987 on the UK Singles Chart with the single "Hey Matthew", (on I.R.S. Records). Fialka works mainly as a conceptual songwriter and record producer with occasional and infrequent live appearances.

"The Things I Saw" was released on the Berlin based !K7 Records label, as part of Booka Shade's DJ-Kicks: Booka Shade album in October 2007. This came as a mashup with another track by Akiko Kiyama.

Fialka released the album Film Noir in March 2009. Featured guest artists included Tilda Swinton and Paul Roberts (Sniff 'n' the Tears).

Bootleg recordings include the titles Morrison Cafe, a deconstruction of songs by The Doors, and To Live Outside the Law You Must Be Honest, where he has done the same to songs written by Bob Dylan.

Songwriting and production credits
Fialka has written songs recorded and/or remixed by other artists, as follows:
"Maybe Someday" – Cliff Richard – Dressed for the Occasion (1983)
"In the Silence of the Night" – Sniff 'n' the Tears – Underground (2001)
"Lip Service" – Sniff 'n' the Tears – Underground (2001)
"The Misidia Monarchy/The Things I Saw" – Booka Shade – DJ-Kicks: Booka Shade (2007)
"Thru the Gate... Every Step of the Way" – Martin Stephenson – Collective Force (2002)
"Today Is Yesterday" – Simeone – An Introduction to Simeone (2011)

Discography

Albums
Still Life (1980)
Human Animal (1988)
Film Noir (2009)

Singles

See also
List of performers on Top of the Pops

References

External links
Personal website
 
 
 

Year of birth missing (living people)
Living people
British new wave musicians
British male singer-songwriters
British record producers
British electronic musicians
British synth-pop new wave musicians
British people of Czech descent
British people of Scottish descent